Cedar Park is a city and a suburb of Austin in the state of Texas, approximately  to the north-west of the center of Austin. According to the 2020 U.S. census, the city's population was 77,595.

History

Before the arrival of European settlers in the 19th century, the Cedar Park area was inhabited by Native American tribes including the Tonkawa, the Lipan Apache, and the Comanche. A paleo-American archaeological site (named the Wilson-Leonard site) was discovered in Cedar Park in 1983 that showed evidence of continual habitation of the area since circa 5000 BC.

In the mid-19th century the community was known as Running Brushy, named after a spring that formed the headwaters of a creek of the same name. In 1873 George and Harriet Cluck, after having run cattle up the Chisholm Trail for many years, bought  of land that included the Running Brushy spring. Their ranch formed the core of the community that would one day become Cedar Park.

Ten years later, the railroad came through. The Austin and Northwestern Railroad, which connected the state capitol with the cities of Burnet and Lampasas to the north, was finished in 1882 and passed through Running Brushy and the Cluck ranch. The community was at this point renamed Bruggerhoff, after a railroad company official. However, the name was generally disliked by locals, being both hard to spell and pronounce. In 1887, Emmett Cluck (son of George and Harriet) changed the community name to Cedar Park. Austinites would ride the train to Cedar Park for day trips to the park.

Cedar Park changed little until the 1950s and 1960s when housing subdivisions began to be built, spurred by the growth of nearby Austin. On February 24, 1973, the citizens of Cedar Park voted to incorporate. The estimated population was 1,765. A library followed in 1978.

On May 27, 1997, a strong and destructive F3 tornado struck the town. The tornado was one of 20 confirmed tornadoes that occurred during the 1997 Central Texas Tornado outbreak. It devastated the downtown area of the city, killing one person and nearly destroying the Albertson's grocery store.

Major retailers began finding their way to the city in 2002 as Walmart opened. Additional large retailers now include Super Target, multiple HEB grocery stores, Academy Sports and Outdoors, Whole Foods, Randalls, Sprouts Farmers Market, and Costco. The major shopping centers include 1890 Ranch, Cedar Park Town Center, The Parke, and the  Cypress Creek Shopping Center. In December 2007, Cedar Park Regional Medical Center opened becoming the first major medical center in Cedar Park.

In 2013, the US Census Bureau named Cedar Park the 4th fastest growing city in the United States, with a population of 57,957.

On April 4, 2016, the city announced it was collecting submissions for designs for an official city flag. Residents had until April 30 to submit proposed designs. On December 9, 2016, Cedar Park unveiled the flag design that won. On August 8, 2019, the City Council voted to rescind that particular design. As of September 2021, the city has no formal flag.

Heritage Oak Tree, 400-years-old, is decorated with over 30,000 lights each year in December. It is 57 feet tall with a spread of 80 feet. The tree is located in the median on Quest Blvd in Cedar Park.

Demographics

As of the 2020 United States census, there were 77,595 people, 25,061 households, and 18,589 families residing in the city.

According to the U.S. census, in 2010, there were 48,937 people living in the city, comprising 17,817 households and 12,926 families. The population density was 2,141.9 people per square mile (592.7/km). There were 8,914 housing units at an average density of 525.3 per square mile (202.8/km).

The racial makeup of the city was 81.4% White, 4.3% African American, 0.5% Native American, 5.1% Asian, 0.1% Native Hawaiian or Pacific Islander, 5.10% from other races, and 3.4% from two or more races. 19% of the population were Hispanic or Latino of any race.

There were 17,817 total households including 12,926 family households. 45.7% of all households had children under the age of 18 living with them and 13.5% of all households had an individual aged 65 years or older living with them. 21.4% of all households were made up of individuals. The average household size was 2.74 and the average family size was 3.22.

The age distribution included 32.8% aged 0 to 19; 38.8% aged 20 to 44, 21.8% aged 45 to 64, and 6.7% who were 65 years of age or older. The median age was 33.4 years.

The median income for a household in the city was $87,466.

Geography

Cedar Park is located at  (30.506620, –97.830317). It lies mostly in Williamson County, although a small amount extends into Travis County.

Cedar Park is generally bisected north to south by U.S. Route 183. A bypass route, the 183A toll road, also runs through Cedar Park and opened to traffic on March 15, 2007. Major east–west routes include RM-1431/Whitestone Boulevard and Cypress Creek/Brushy Creek Road.

Government
Cedar Park was incorporated in 1973 with a council–manager system of local government. As of the election on May 6, 2017, Cedar Park City Council members are as follows:

The seven members serve two year terms. The mayor and council members place two, place four and place six are elected in even years. Council members place one, place three and place five are elected in odd years.

Cedar Park is represented in Texas House of Representatives by Democrat John Bucy III. In the Texas State Senate, Cedar Park is represented by Republican Charles Schwertner. In the United States House of Representatives, Cedar Park is represented by Republican John Carter.

Sports
Cedar Park is home to the Texas Stars of the American Hockey League and the Austin Spurs of the NBA G League both play home games at the H-E-B Center at Cedar Park.

A public skate park facility opened in Cedar Park in July 2010. The  facility features a large bowl, mini bowl, and modern street course.

Institutions and schools
Cedar Park is served primarily by the Leander Independent School District, and is home to the Cedar Park High School Timberwolves and the Vista Ridge High School Rangers. Cedar Park won its first football state championship on December 21, 2012. The Timberwolves defeated Lancaster 17–7 at Cowboys Stadium in Arlington, winning the Class 4A, Division II state title. In 2015, the Timberwolves won both state titles in Band and Football with the latter beating Frisco Lone Star for the Class 5a, Division II state championship. Cedar Park High school is the only Texas high school to win UIL state titles in both band and football in the same year.

Neighborhoods in the southern and easternmost areas of the city are wholly or partially served by the Round Rock Independent School District. Some of these neighborhoods or the Ranch at Brushy Creek, or Walsh Trails. Some elementary schools that serve these neighborhoods are Old Town, or Patsy Sommer. The middle school Walsh, and the high school Round Rock also serve these areas.

The city is home to the Cypress Creek campus of Austin Community College, which was significantly expanded in 2008 to accommodate the area's growing population.

The Texas Psychological Association is located in the city.

H-E-B Center at Cedar Park
The H-E-B Center at Cedar Park (formerly known as Cedar Park Center) was completed in 2009 and hosts a wide array of live entertainment events. George Strait opened the Cedar Park Center as the first event at the Center on September 25, 2009. The H-E-B Center is also home of the Texas Stars, the AHL affiliate of the Dallas Stars, and the Austin Spurs, the G-league affiliate of the San Antonio Spurs. The center is located at the corner of New Hope Drive and 183A Toll Road.

See also

 Austin Western Railroad

Notes

References

External links

 City of Cedar Park website
 Cedar Park (city), Texas Quick Facts

 
Cities in Texas
Cities in Travis County, Texas
Cities in Williamson County, Texas
Cities in Greater Austin